The Black Jaguar-White Tiger Foundation (or BJWT) is an unregistered and unlicensed non-profit 501(c)(3) wildlife facility located in Mexico. BJWT hosts big cats as well as dogs and other animals. BJWT was shut down by Mexican authorities on July 5, 2022, due to a viral video showing the cats eating themselves alive.

History 
In 2013, BJWT was founded in Monterrey, Mexico by businessman Eduardo Serio. The organization's big cats come from circuses, breeders and zoos.

Numerous celebrities have visited the sanctuary, including Lewis Hamilton, Khloe Kardashian, Paris Hilton and The Backstreet Boys. Concerns over unsafe contact between humans and big cats have garnered criticism from animal rights advocates. Both PETA and Wild Welfare have criticized BJWT for exploiting and mistreating the wild cats, keeping them in small enclosures and promoting wild cats as pets. PETA have also raised concerns about the large amount of cubs, who are likely torn away from their mothers and don't have their basic needs met. They also claim that when the animals get older, they are typically cast aside.

The foundation is not accredited by the Global Federation of Animal Sanctuaries.

In July 2022, footage was released of animals, particularly the big cats in "deplorable" conditions, struggling to stand, emaciated and gnawing off their own tails. The Association of Zoos, Breeders and Aquariums of Mexico AC (AZCARM) also filed a complaint with the Attorney General as well as a lawsuit against Serio, claiming that the sanctuary was no longer licensed or registered after the animals were moved from the original approved habitat to a smaller, unsuitable space. Former employees and activists have filed complaints, alleging that the animals are put down if they are too big for their enclosure and often die due to exposure to the elements, lack of food and water and lack of access to veterinary services.

Shutdown 
The sanctuary was shut down on Monday, July 4th after being raided by Mexican officials. 177 felines, 17 monkeys, 4 canines, 2 donkeys and 2 coyotes were removed and placed with various Mexican zoos. According to prosecutors, Serio is wanted for "extreme abandonment and mistreatment of hundreds of large felines." Mexico's Attorney General alleges that the "Animals devoured themselves to avoid starvation." Documentary filmmaker Arturo Allende, who has been working on a documentary about Black Jaguar-White Tiger Foundation, stated that it was: “a holocaust for the animals".

References

External links 

Cat conservation organizations
Cat sanctuaries
Nature conservation in Mexico
Organizations established in 2013